Henology refers to the philosophical account or discourse on The One that appears most notably in the philosophy of Plotinus. Reiner Schürmann describes it as a "metaphysics of radical transcendence" that extends beyond being and intellection.

Areas of inquiry
Henology stands in contradistinction to several other philosophical disciplines. The term henology refers to the discipline that centers around The One, as in the philosophies of Plato and Plotinus. It is sometimes used in contradistinction to disciplines that treat being as their starting point (as in Aristotle and Avicenna), and also to those that seek to understand knowledge and truth (as in Kant and Descartes).

See also 
 Absolute (philosophy)
 Deleuzian metaphysics
 "The One is not" in the metaphysics of Alan Badiou's work Being and Event 
 Giovanni Pico della Mirandola
 "God above God" in the philosophy of Paul Tillich
 Henosis, union with what is fundamental in reality
 Monad (philosophy)
 Monism
 Non-philosophy
 Univocity of being

References

Concepts in ancient Greek metaphysics
Metaphysics of mind
Monism
Mysticism
Neoplatonism
Panentheism
Religious philosophical concepts